Florida's 38th Senate District elects one member of the Florida Senate. The district consists of part of Miami-Dade county. Its current representative is Alexis Calatayud.

Election Results

Senators from 1927 - Present

References

Miami-Dade County, Florida
Florida Senate districts